"Survival" is a song by the English rock band Muse. The track is the first single from the band's sixth studio album, The 2nd Law. "Survival" served as the official theme song of the 2012 Summer Olympics held in London, United Kingdom and was released following its premiere on BBC Radio 1.

Background and writing

In 2011, Matthew Bellamy was asked to compose a song for the London 2012 Olympics. According to him, the project then "went away," though a song was written regardless. Bellamy and his fellow band members brought the song to Olympic staff, who "said they'd love to use it as the official tune." The track, Bellamy noted, "expresses a sense of conviction and determination to win."

"Survival" was played as the athletes entered the stadium and in the period before medal ceremonies; international broadcasters played it while reporting on the Games. In addition, the song was included on the album London 2012 Rock The Games. The song was also premièred live during Muse's live set for the London 2012 closing ceremony. However NBC, the channel that broadcasts the Olympics in the US, did not broadcast their set.

Release
"Survival" premiered on BBC Radio 1 on 27 June 2012. It was the first single from the band's 2012 album The 2nd Law, released in October. The official music video was released on 4 July 2012. It showed a montage of past Olympic events, including both celebratory and disappointing experiences for certain athletes.

Reception
"Survival" received mixed reviews from fans and critics alike. The Associated Press called the song "a thundering rock anthem". NME columnist Mark Beaumont was perturbed that the band's latest track was "assimilated into something as annoying" as the Olympics. He continued that "'Survival' might be amongst the most ear-scorchingly, arse-burstingly, aneurysm-inducingly brilliant songs in Muse’s canon, but it’ll forever be deemed corny by its association with one long-past sporting event." Adam Boult of The Guardian referred to the track as "a hilarious five-minute onslaught of camp, falling somewhere between Queen, Gloria Gaynor and a Monty Python sketch. Swelling strings, battle drums, ludicrous falsetto shrieking and chugga-chugga guitar channelling the Little Engine That Could. It's as insanely overblown as the Olympics themselves." Meanwhile, Jon Holmes of BBC Radio 4's The Now Show described it as an "Epically proportioned cacophony of enormous noise" that was like "the sound of an orchestra falling down some stairs" created by "throwing a hand-grenade into a music cupboard and recording the results".  He depicted the drumkit as like "the noise of a rhino knocking a wall down" and memorably stated that "This is the song I want to hear when the world ends".

Track listing

Charts

Release history

See also 
 Isles of Wonder: official soundtrack album of the London 2012 Olympics opening ceremony
 A Symphony of British Music: the official soundtrack album of the London 2012 Olympics closing ceremony.

References

2012 singles
2012 Summer Olympics
Muse (band) songs
Rock ballads
Olympic theme songs
Summer Olympic official songs and anthems
2012 songs
Songs written by Matt Bellamy
Warner Records singles